Cnemaspis heteropholis, also known as the Gund day gecko or different-scaled day gecko, is a species of geckos found in India (Gund, Uttara Kannada).

The male of the species has been recently described from Agumbe in Karnataka. This Western Ghats endemic species is known from Gund, Uttara Kannada district, Pushpagiri, Dakshina Kannada district and Agumbe, Shivamoga district in Karnataka (Bauer, 2002; Biswas, 2008; Ganesh et al., 2011; Srinivasulu & Srinivasulu, 2013).

References

 Bauer, A.M. 2002 Two new species of Cnemaspis (Reptilia: Squamata: Gekkonidae) from Gund, Uttara Kannada, India. Mitt. Hamburg. Zool. Mus. Inst. 99: 155–167.
 Biswas, S. 2008. A possible occurrence of regional integumentary loss in Cnemaspis heteropholis from southern India. Gekko 5(2): 28–30.
 Ganesh, S.R., R. Sreekar, S.P. Pal, G. Ramchandra, C. Srinivasulu & B. Srinivasulu (2011). Discovery and first description of male Cnemaspis heteropholis Bauer, 2002 (Reptilia: Gekkonidae) from Agumbe, central Western Ghats, India. Journal of Threatened Taxa 3(8): 2023–2027.
 Srinivasulu, C. & Srinivasulu, B. 2013. Cnemaspis heteropholis. In: IUCN 2013. IUCN Red List of Threatened Species. Version 2013.2. <www.iucnredlist.org>. Downloaded on 12 March 2014.

Cnemaspis
Reptiles described in 2002